Zard Ab (also Romanized as Zard Āb) is a village in Harazpey-ye Shomali Rural District, Sorkhrud District, Mahmudabad County, Mazandaran Province, Iran. At the 2006 census, its population was 1,073, in 307 families.

References 

Populated places in Mahmudabad County